Martín Vladimir Rodríguez Torrejón (born 5 August 1994), nicknamed Tin Rodríguez, is a Chilean professional footballer who plays as a midfielder for Major League Soccer side D.C. United.

Statistics

International goals
 (Chile score listed first, score column indicates score after each Rodríguez goal)

Club
Huachipato
 Primera División (1): 2012–C

Colo-Colo
 Primera División (1): 2015–A
 Copa Chile (1): 2016

References

External links

 
 

1994 births
Living people
People from Chañaral Province
Chilean footballers
Chile international footballers
Chile under-20 international footballers
Chilean expatriate footballers
C.D. Huachipato footballers
Colo-Colo footballers
Cruz Azul footballers
Club Universidad Nacional footballers
Atlético Morelia players
Mazatlán F.C. footballers
Altay S.K. footballers
D.C. United players
Chilean Primera División players
Liga MX players
Süper Lig players
Major League Soccer players
Expatriate footballers in Mexico
Chilean expatriate sportspeople in Mexico
Expatriate footballers in Turkey
Chilean expatriate sportspeople in Turkey
Expatriate soccer players in the United States
Chilean expatriate sportspeople in the United States
Association football midfielders
Association football forwards
2017 FIFA Confederations Cup players